Jan Kleinheerenbrink is a Dutch Paralympic athlete. He represented the Netherlands at the 1988 Summer Paralympics and at the 1992 Summer Paralympics. In total, he won one gold medal, one silver medal and one bronze medal.

In 1988, he won the gold medal in the 200 metres 4 event, the silver medal in the 100 metres 4 event and the bronze medal in the 400 metres 4 event.

References

External links 
 

Living people
Year of birth missing (living people)
Place of birth missing (living people)
Paralympic gold medalists for the Netherlands
Paralympic silver medalists for the Netherlands
Paralympic bronze medalists for the Netherlands
Paralympic medalists in athletics (track and field)
Athletes (track and field) at the 1988 Summer Paralympics
Athletes (track and field) at the 1992 Summer Paralympics
Medalists at the 1988 Summer Paralympics
Paralympic athletes of the Netherlands
Dutch male wheelchair racers
20th-century Dutch people
21st-century Dutch people